is a Japanese politician who was Prime Minister of Japan and President of the Democratic Party of Japan (DPJ) from June 2010 to September 2011. Kan was the first Prime Minister since the resignation of Junichiro Koizumi in 2006 to serve for more than one year, with his predecessors Yukio Hatoyama, Tarō Asō, Yasuo Fukuda, and Shinzō Abe either resigning prematurely or losing an election. On 26 August 2011, Kan announced his resignation. Yoshihiko Noda was elected as his successor. On 1 August 2012, United Nations Secretary-General Ban Ki-moon announced Kan would be one of the members of the UN high-level panel on the post-2015 development agenda.

Early life and education
Kan was born in Ube, Yamaguchi, the eldest son of Hisao Kan, the executive director of the glass manufacturing company Central Glass. He graduated in 1970 from the Tokyo Institute of Technology and became a licensed benrishi (patent agent/attorney) in 1971.

Diet career

After graduating from college, Kan worked at a patent office for four years. He actively engaged in civic grassroots movements for years and also served on election campaign staff for Fusae Ichikawa, a women's rights activist.

After having lost in the 1976 and 1979 general elections and 1977 Upper House election, Kan achieved a seat in the lower house in 1980 as a member of the Socialist Democratic Federation. He gained national popularity in 1996, when serving as the Minister of Health and Welfare, admitting the government's responsibility for the spread of HIV-tainted blood in the 1980s and directly apologized to victims. At that time, he was a member of a small party forming the ruling coalition with the Liberal Democratic Party (LDP). His frank action was completely unprecedented and was applauded by the media and the public. 

In 1998, his image was affected by allegations of an affair, vigorously denied by both parties, with a television newscaster and media consultant, Yūko Tonomoto. After Yukio Hatoyama resigned as the leader of the Democratic Party of Japan (DPJ), Kan again took over the position. In July 2003, the DPJ and the Liberal Party led by Ichirō Ozawa agreed to form a united opposition party to prepare for the general election that was anticipated to take place in the fall.

During the campaign of the election of 2003, the DPJ called the election as the choice of the government between the ruling LDP-bloc and the DPJ, with Kan being presented as the alternative candidate to then Prime Minister Junichiro Koizumi. His face was used as the trademark of the campaign against the LDP.

However, in 2004 Kan was accused of unpaid annuities and again resigned the position of leader. On 10 May 2004, he officially announced his resignation and made the Shikoku Pilgrimage. Later, the Ministry of Health, Labour and Welfare spokesman apologized, saying the unpaid record was due to an administrative error.

In mid-October 2005, Kan, who turned 60 in 2006, proposed the creation of a new political party to be called the "Dankai (baby boomer) Party". The initial intent of the party was to offer places of activity for the Japanese baby boomers –  of whom began to retire en masse in 2007.

He believes the Japan Self-Defense Forces should play a more prominent role on the international stage.

Finance minister
On 6 January 2010, he was picked by Yukio Hatoyama to be the new finance minister, assuming the post in addition to deputy prime minister. He replaced Hirohisa Fujii as finance minister.

In his first news conference, Kan announced his priority was stimulating growth and took the unusual step of naming a specific dollar-yen level as optimal to help exporters and stimulate the economy: "There are a lot of voices in the business world saying that (the dollar) around ¥95 is appropriate in terms of trade". Hatoyama appeared to rebuke Kan. "When it comes to foreign exchange, stability is desirable and rapid moves are undesirable. The government basically shouldn't comment on foreign exchange," he told reporters.

Prime minister

On 2 June 2010, Yukio Hatoyama announced his intention to resign as the leader of the Democratic Party of Japan (DPJ) and as prime minister, also saying that he had urged his backer in the party, Ichirō Ozawa, to resign as secretary general. The Cabinet resigned en masse on 4 June. Foreign Minister Katsuya Okada and Land and Transport Minister Seiji Maehara, though once considered to be possible successors to Hatoyama, announced their support for Naoto Kan. Kan, at his age of 63, won the leadership of the DPJ with 291 votes to 129, defeating a relatively unknown Ozawa-backed legislator Shinji Tarutoko, 50, who was leading the environmental policy committee in the lower house of the Diet.

Subsequently, on 4 June, Kan was designated prime minister by the Diet. On 8 June, Emperor Akihito formally appointed Kan as the country's 94th prime minister, and the 29th postwar prime minister. His cabinet was formed later on the day.

Kan's approval ratings fell in the month of June after he proposed an increase in the sales tax rate from 5% to 10%. His sales tax increase proposal was opposed by Ichirō Ozawa, amongst others in the DPJ, and the proposal was quickly scaled back by Kan. The botched sales tax increase proposal was partially blamed for the DPJ's disappointing results in the July House of Councillors election, where the DPJ lost its majority and was forced to work with smaller, unaffiliated parties (such as Your Party, the JCP, and the SDP) in order to secure passage of bills in the House of Councillors.

In August, Kan apologised to the Republic of Korea on the 100th anniversary of the Japan–Korea Annexation Treaty.

Ozawa challenged Kan's leadership of the DPJ in September. Although it was initially believed that Ozawa had a slight edge among DPJ members of parliament, in the final vote Kan garnered the support of 206 DPJ lawmakers to Ozawa's 200. Local rank-and-file party members and activists overwhelmingly supported Kan, and according to opinion polls the wider Japanese public preferred Kan to Ozawa by as much as a 4:1 ratio.

After the leadership challenge, Kan reshuffled his cabinet, which left many prominent members of the pro-Ozawa faction of the DPJ without important posts in the new cabinet. The cabinet reshuffle also resulted in the promotion of long-time Kan ally Yoshito Sengoku to Chief Cabinet Secretary. Sengoku was labeled by the opposition LDP as the "second" Prime Minister of the Kan cabinet.

On 7 September, a Chinese fishing boat captain was arrested by the Japan Coast Guard (JCG) after his trawler had collided with JCG patrol boats in disputed waters near the Senkaku Islands. China protested the arrest, as it claims the islands as part of its sovereign territory, and demanded the unconditional release of the captain. The captain was released on 24 September, after China had cut off all ministerial-level contacts with Japan and threatened further action. The incident brought Sino-Japanese relations to its lowest point since the Koizumi administration.

The Kan government intervened in mid-September to weaken the surging yen by buying U.S. dollars, a move which temporarily relieved Japan's exporters. The move proved popular with stock brokers, Japanese exporters, and the Japanese public. It was the first such move by a Japanese government since 2004. Later, in October, after the yen had offset the intervention and had reached a 15-year high, the Kan cabinet approved a stimulus package worth about 5.1 trillion yen ($62 billion) in order to weaken the yen and fight deflation.

In November, Kan spoke out forcefully in support of South Korea and in harsh criticism of North Korea in the wake of the latter's bombardment of Yeonpyeong, meanwhile ignoring China's public comments which had not yet included denunciation of the North.

On 12 March 2011, after the earthquake and tsunami in the northeast Japan, Kan flew in a helicopter to observe the Fukushima I Nuclear Power Plant and was heavily involved in efforts to effectively respond to the Fukushima Daiichi nuclear disaster. Naoto Kan took an increasingly anti-nuclear stance in the months following the Fukushima disaster. In May, he ordered that the aging Hamaoka Nuclear Power Plant be closed over earthquake and tsunami fears, and he said he would freeze plans to build new reactors.

Despite falling popularity, Kan rejected calls to step down while the country continued to suffer from the earthquake, tsunami, and nuclear crises of spring 2011. One year into his premiership on 2 June 2011, Kan proposed his resignation, hours before the Diet put forward a vote of no-confidence. The motion was defeated by 293 to 152, bolstering the Prime Minister's position.

In July 2011, Kan said that Japan must reduce its dependence on nuclear energy, breaking with a decades-old Japanese government drive to build more nuclear power plants in the country. "We must scrap the plan to have nuclear power contribute 53 percent (of electricity supply) by 2030 and reduce the degree of reliance on nuclear power," Kan told a government panel. Kan said Japan should abandon plans to build 14 new reactors by 2030. He wants to "pass a bill to promote renewable energy and questioned whether private companies should be running atomic plants". In August, Kan removed three of Japan's top nuclear energy officials in effort to break ties between government and the atomic industry. In 2012, Kan said the Fukushima disaster made it clear to him that "Japan needs to dramatically reduce its dependence on nuclear power, which supplied 30 percent of its electricity before the crisis, and has turned him into a believer of renewable energy".

Kan announced his intention to resign on 10 August 2011. On 26 August, with passage of a debt bill and the renewable energy bill as final conditions, Kan expected "to see his successor in office [within the] week, according to a Kyodo news report, which cited cabinet ministers". At the same time, Seiji Maehara, who had supported Kan in 2010, was reported to have announced his intention to run to succeed Kan. Maehara is seen as the potential DPJ candidate most popular with the voters at the time. Several other cabinet members joined the race, and the election of the DPJ successor was scheduled for 29 August. At that time, Yoshihiko Noda, most recently finance minister, was elected as the new DPJ leader and, as leader of the largest party in the Diet, became prime minister as well.

In 2012, Kan was interviewed about the Fukushima nuclear disaster, and has said that at one point Japan faced a situation where there was a chance that people might not be able to live in the capital zone including Tokyo and would have to evacuate. He says he is haunted by the specter of an even bigger nuclear crisis forcing tens of millions of people to flee Tokyo and threatening the nation's existence. "If things had reached that level, not only would the public have had to face hardships but Japan's very existence would have been in peril". That convinced Kan to "declare the need for Japan to end its reliance on atomic power and promote renewable sources of energy such solar [sic] that have long taken a back seat in the resource-poor country's energy mix". He told a parliamentary investigation in 2012 that the nuclear industry had "shown no remorse" for the disaster, and was trying to push Japan back to nuclear power.

Post Prime Ministership
During 16 December 2012 Tokyo gubernatorial election, called due to the resignation of incumbent Governor Shintaro Ishihara, the Democratic Party of Japan itself did not endorse any candidate, but Kan supported Kenji Utsunomiya, who shared Kan's anti-nuclear stance. Ultimately Utsunomiya came second in the election, losing to Naoki Inose who had been vice-governor under Ishihara from 2007 to 2012, and then acting governor after Ishihara's abrupt resignation.

In the 2012 general election called by Kan's successor Noda, Kan lost his seat in the Tokyo 18th district, but retained a seat in the diet through the proportional representation system. In the 2014 general election, Kan lost his district seat but was again elected through the proportional block. He joined the Constitutional Democratic Party of Japan along with the liberal-leaning members of the Democratic Party following the party split prior to the 2017 general election. In the election, he regained his district seat, defeating the LDP incumbent Masatada Tsuchiya with a margin of 1,046 votes.

Personal life
Kan married his wife Nobuko in 1970. Nobuko, born in Okayama Prefecture, entered a relationship with the Tokyo-dwelling Kan after entering Tsuda College. As the two are first cousins, the engagement was met with parental opposition. They have two sons, Gentarō and Shinjirō. Gentarō is a civil rights activist and lost in elections for the Lower House in 2003 and 2005. Shinjiro is a veterinarian and works at an animal hospital in Nerima, Tokyo.

Kan is nicknamed "Ira-Kan" (Fretful Kan") due to his reputed short temper. His hobbies were go, shogi and origami. Kan built a machine to calculate the complicated mahjong point system and applied for a patent in 1973.

References

External links

 BBC NEWS – Profile: Naoto Kan
 Official Website
 Democratic Party of Japan
 Japan after Kan: Implications for the DPJ’s Political Future, Q&A with Richard J. Samuels, August 2011

|-

|-

|-

|-

|-

|-

|-

|-

|-

|-

|-

|-

|-

1946 births
Living people
21st-century prime ministers of Japan
Japanese Buddhists
Politicians from Yamaguchi Prefecture
Tokyo Institute of Technology alumni
Constitutional Democratic Party of Japan politicians
Democratic Party of Japan politicians
Deputy Prime Ministers of Japan
Liberalism in Japan
Prime Ministers of Japan
Japanese patent attorneys
Ministers of Health and Welfare of Japan
Ministers of Finance of Japan
Members of the House of Representatives from Tokyo
21st-century Japanese politicians